The SINCERE Cup 2016 Yongchuan International Tournament was the second edition of the Yongchuan International Tournament, an invitational women's football tournament held in Yongchuan District, Chongqing, China.

Participants
In October 2016, the participants were announced.

Venues

Standings

Match results
All times are local, CST (UTC+8).

Statistics

References 

2016 in women's association football
2017
2016 in Chinese football
October 2016 sports events in China
2016 in Chinese women's sport